Airforce Delta Storm, known as  in Japan and simply as Deadly Skies (same as the first game) in Europe, is a fighter jet video game released in 2001 for the Xbox. It is the sequel to the Sega Dreamcast game Airforce Delta.

A game also named Airforce Delta Storm was released in 2002 for the Game Boy Advance. While having the same name, this game's plot is based on the previous title in the series, Airforce Delta.

Story 
The story of AFDS is set in a 20X1-20X7 time when scientific technology has reached an all new level and the ability to cure almost all human diseases has become a reality. However, as a result, the Earth has become overpopulated and basic necessities are becoming scarce. In the midst of the growing epidemic, those nations that are highly industrialized but not producing enough food for themselves banded to form the "United Forces" and use their military advantage to seize agricultural lands whereas those nations that are under the threat of United Forces invasion have pooled their resources to form the "Allied Forces".

Gameplay 
The gameplay of AirForce Delta Storm is very similar to its predecessor Airforce Delta in the sense that the player controls various aircraft to engage enemies and accomplish missions. A new feature of AFDS is the 'World Map' where the player moves his aircraft across the map through various checkpoints and flies to a mission. Some of these checkpoints can be 'recaptured' by the enemy so the player must make careful account of how much 'Range' his aircraft has; 'Range' allows the player to continue across the map without having to deal with enemy forces. When the player locates the mission on-screen the player flies his aircraft towards the mission icon (either a land-based structure or a ship) and selects it.

There are three levels of controls, ranging from Novice, which allows the player to pick up the game and play without having to learn how to control pitch and yaw and how to do a complex roll during a corkscrewing backflip. There is Expert, where the player can control the pitch and yaw of the plane and even do rolls. Then there is Ace, in which the player can use the airbrake feature and the throttle sticks in place after he lets go of the increase/decrease speed buttons.

Differences 
There are several differences between AFDS and its predecessor Airforce Delta:
 AFDS does not allow the player to choose a difficulty level.
 The player can choose the color of (but cannot edit) the HUD.
 AFDS does not allow the player to check his stats.

Reception 

The game received "mixed or average reviews" on both platforms according to the review aggregation website Metacritic. NextGen said of the Xbox version, "It's not bad, but there's really not anything new to see here." In Japan, Famitsu gave the Game Boy Advance and Xbox versions each a score of 29 out of 40.

References

External links 
 
 

2001 video games
Combat flight simulators
Game Boy Advance games
Konami games
Xbox games
Airforce Delta
Video games developed in Japan